This is a list of episodes of Koihime Musō, a Japanese anime television series based on the visual novel of the same name. The Koihime Musou anime began airing in Japan on July 8 and ended on September 23, 2008, on Tokyo MX and the Chiba TV. It was directed by Nobuaki Nakanishi. It was followed by an OVA released on April 1, 2009.

Koihime Musō (2008)

Shin Koihime Musō (2009)

Shin Koihime Musō: Otome Tairan (2010)

References

External links
 Official Koihime Musō anime website 
 Official Shin Koihime Musō anime website 
 
 
 

Koihime Musō
Koihime Muso